Adventure on the Night Express is a 1925 German silent thriller film directed by Harry Piel and starring Piel, Dary Holm and José Davert.

The film's sets were designed by the art director Fritz Kraenke and Kurt Richter.

Cast
 Harry Piel as Harry Piel
 Dary Holm as Baronesse Myra von Geldern
 José Davert as Charles Theewen
 Lissy Arna as Gräfin Sonja Waranow
 Albert Paulig as Detektiv Fix
 Georg John as Theewens Diener Raoul
 Fritz Greiner as Variété-Direktor

References

Bibliography

External links

1925 films
Films of the Weimar Republic
Films directed by Harry Piel
German silent feature films
1920s thriller films
German thriller films
Rail transport films
German black-and-white films
Phoebus Film films
Silent thriller films
1920s German films